The 2018 Auckland Darts Masters, presented by Burger King & TAB was the fourth staging of the tournament by the Professional Darts Corporation, as the fourth entry in the 2018 World Series of Darts. The tournament featured 16 players (eight PDC players facing eight regional qualifiers) and was held at The Trusts Arena in Auckland, New Zealand from 3–5 August 2018.

Kyle Anderson was the defending champion after defeating compatriot Corey Cadby 11–10 in the 2017 final, but lost 10–3 to Peter Wright in the quarter-finals. 

Michael van Gerwen won the title after beating Raymond van Barneveld 11–4 in the final.

Prize money
The total prize fund was £60,000.

Qualifiers
The eight invited PDC representatives, (seeded according to the 2018 World Series of Darts Order of Merit) are:

  Rob Cross (quarter-finals)
  Gary Anderson (quarter-finals)
  Peter Wright (semi-finals)
  Michael Smith (first round)
  Michael van Gerwen (winner)
  Raymond van Barneveld (runner-up)
  Simon Whitlock (semi-finals)
  Kyle Anderson (quarter-finals)

The regional qualifiers are:

2018 UK Open runner-up Corey Cadby was originally announced as a PDC representative, before later being named as a regional qualifier, and then withdrawing due to a visa issue. Ben Robb replaced him.

Draw

References

Auckland Darts Masters
Auckland Darts Masters
World Series of Darts
Sport in Auckland
Auckland Darts Masters